Pernille Dupont (born 6 October 1967) is a retired female badminton player from Denmark.

She won the silver medal at the 1991 IBF World Championships in mixed doubles with Thomas Lund. She competed in badminton at the 1992 Summer Olympics in women's doubles with Grete Mogensen.

External links
 
 

1967 births
Living people
Danish female badminton players
Badminton players at the 1992 Summer Olympics
Olympic badminton players of Denmark
20th-century Danish women